Baltic is a village in Coshocton, Holmes, and Tuscarawas counties in the U.S. state of Ohio. The population was 795 at the 2010 census. The Raber's Almanac for the Amish community is published here. Baltic is also home to the garage door opener factory of The Genie Company, one of the few companies to manufacture them in the USA.

Baltic was originally called Rowville, and under the latter name was platted in 1848. Baltic became a qualified Tree City USA as recognized by the National Arbor Day Foundation in 1982.

Geography
Baltic is located at  (40.443367, -81.702656). Baltic is one hour and forty five minutes south of Cleveland.

Demographics

90.2% spoke English, 5.3% German, 2.3% Dutch and Pennsylvania German as their first language.

2010 census
As of the 2010 census, there were 795 people, 277 households, and 187 families living in the village. The racial makeup of the village was 98.5% White, 0.6% African American, 0.1% Asian, and 0.8% from two or more races. Hispanic or Latino of any race were 0.3% of the population. 65.1% were of German, 14.3% Irish, 9.5% Swiss, and 5.8% English descent.

There were 277 households, of which 33.9% had children under the age of 18 living with them, 54.5% were married couples living together, 8.7% had a female householder with no husband present, 4.3% had a male householder with no wife present, and 32.5% were non-families. 27.1% of all households were made up of individuals, and 15.6% had someone living alone who was 65 years of age or older. The average household size was 2.53 and the average family size was 3.11.

The median age in the village was 40.9 years. 25.2% of residents were under the age of 18; 6.1% were between the ages of 18 and 24; 23.9% were from 25 to 44; 23.5% were from 45 to 64; and 21.4% were 65 years of age or older. The gender makeup of the village was 50.1% male and 49.9% female.

Notable people
Owen Scheetz, appeared in six games for the Washington Senators during the 1943 season

References

Amish in Ohio
Swiss-American culture in Ohio
Villages in Coshocton County, Ohio
Villages in Holmes County, Ohio
Villages in Tuscarawas County, Ohio